Ruy Alexandre Guerra Coelho Pereira (born August 22, 1931) is a Portuguese-Brazilian film director and screenwriter. Guerra was born a Portuguese citizen in Lourenço Marques (today Maputo) in Mozambique, when it was still a Portuguese colony.

Biography 
Guerra studied at IDHEC film school in Paris from 1952. In 1958 he started his career as an assistant director in several French films. He subsequently immigrated to Brazil, where he directed his first feature film, Os Cafajestes (1962). It was entered into the 12th Berlin International Film Festival.

In 1964, Guerra directed Os Fuzis, which placed him in the forefront of the emerging Cinema Novo movement. The film was entered into the 14th Berlin International Film Festival where it won the Silver Bear Extraordinary Jury Prize.

After that he directed the international production Tendres Chasseurs (1969) starring Sterling Hayden, and Os Deuses e os Mortos (1970). The tumultuous political landscape in 1970's Brazil forced Guerra to stop filming until 1976, when he directed A Queda. The film was entered into the 28th Berlin International Film Festival, where it won the Silver Bear - Special Jury Prize.

In 1980 he returned to Mozambique where he shot Mueda, Memória e Massacre, that country's first feature film. While in Mozambique, Guerra shot many short films and helped the creation of the National Institute for Cinema.

In 1982 Guerra shot Eréndira in Mexico, based on the work by Gabriel García Márquez. He also directed the musical comedy A Ópera do Malandro (1985), based on Chico Buarque's free theatrical adaptation of Bertold Brecht's Threepenny Opera; the TV film Os Amores Difíceis, another adaptation of García Márquez; and Kuarup (1989). In 2000 Guerra's Estorvo was nominated for the Golden Palm at the 2000 Cannes Film Festival. It was Guerra's third nomination in the festival, after Erêndira and Kuarup. His 2004 film Portugal S.A. was the only film he did in Portugal and entered into the 26th Moscow International Film Festival.

Guerra has appeared in many films as an actor; he is perhaps best known to international audiences for his performance as the doomed Pedro de Ursúa in Werner Herzog's Aguirre, the Wrath of God (1972).

Personal life
In 1971, Guerra married Brazilian actress Leila Diniz. Diniz was killed the following year in the crash of Japan Airlines Flight 471 in India.

Filmography

See also 
 S.O.S. Noronha (1957)

References

External links
 

1931 births
Living people
People from Maputo
Portuguese film directors
Portuguese emigrants to Brazil
Brazilian film directors
Brazilian male film actors
Brazilian film editors
Naturalized citizens of Brazil